Rodman Slough is a wetland that drains into Clear Lake in Lake County, California. It provides an important habitat for fish, amphibians, birds and other wildlife. 
It is fed by Scotts Creek and Middle Creek, which contribute about 70% of the sediment and nutrients that cause algae problems in Clear Lake.
The slough is the remnant of a much larger area of wetlands and open water that extended from Tule Lake to the northeast through a wide area of land north and east of the present slough that was drained for farmland.
Since 1978 there have been proposals to restore large parts of the former wetlands, and much of the funding has been approved, but progress has been slow.

Location

It flows south for  into Clear Lake.
The Scotts Creek and Middle Creek watersheds feed the slough.
They supply about 70% of the sediment and nutrients delivered to Clear Lake, which cause the algae population to increase in the lake.
During periods of heavy runoff the two creeks raise the level of the slough and the water moves at significant speed.
Fine sediments are carried into Clear Lake, while coarse sediments are gradually filling in the slough.
The high flows also erode the levees that protect adjacent reclaimed farmland.

Environment

Tule Lake is a seasonal lake that forms in the winter when Scotts Creek overflows its banks.
It drains along Scotts Creek into Rodman Slough,
The Tule Lake / Rodman Slough area is an important stopover for migratory songbirds and supports cover for many waterfowl and water birds.
The Rodman Slough wetland areas and the oak woodlands that surround them have a large rookery of great blue heron (Ardea herodias), where migrating birds congregate in the fall.
Other birds include American white pelican (Pelecanus erythrorhynchos), Canada goose (Branta canadensis), cormorant (Phalacrocoracidae), heron and egret (Ardeidae) and grebe (Podicipediformes).
The slough is an important breeding and nursery area for fish species such as black bass (Micropterus), black crappie (Pomoxis nigromaculatus), white crappie (Pomoxis annularis) and catfish.

History

In the past the Scotts and Middle creeks flowed through Robinson Lake, also called Rodman Bay, before entering Clear Lake.
Robinson Lake was a mosaic of shallow wetlands, meandering channels, riparian forest and open water.
Bloody island was historically an upland island in Robinson Lake surrounded by a complex of seasonal and perennial wetland.
The island was the site of the 1850 Bloody Island massacre in response to a Pomo revolt from slavery.

Between 1918 and 1933 farmers built levees in Robinson Lake and the area was drained for agriculture, leaving only the narrow Rodman Slough along the west of the former lake.

In 1955 Congressman Hubert B. Scudder introduced a bill, which was authorized, for flood control works on Middle Creek at an estimated Federal cost of $1,110,000 and Non-Federal Cost of $790,000.
At this time the community of Upper Lake was partially flooded three times a year, and almost all the town was flooded every ten years.
In 1966 the United States Army Corps of Engineers (USACE) completed levees on the north side of Scotts Creek between Tule Lake and the mouth of Rodman Slough as part of the Middle Creek Flood Control project.
The levees were intended to reduce the risk of flooding urban communities and agricultural areas.

In 1978 the Federal Emergency Management Agency (FEMA) determined that much of the area covered by the flood control project was in the 100-year floodplain of Clear Lake. 
Restoring the area to its natural state would reduce costs of maintaining old levees and drainage pumps, and reduce or eliminate the cost of fighting floods in high water years.

There is a very real risk that the levees will be submerged by the type of flood expected at least once every century.
The Robinson Lake area was evacuated due to flood threats in 1983, 1986 and 1998.
In 1995 Scotts Creek overtopped the levee, flooding parts of Highway 20.

In 2004 the Fish and Game Commission designated the Clear Lake Wildlife Area, a  wildlife area extending to the east of the slough in which visitors could engage in birdwatching, seasonal fishing, wildlife viewing and hunting.
It included oak-covered hills, dense tule marsh and an extensive riparian habitat.
It supports herons, red-tailed hawks, osprey, songbirds, waterfowl, deer, gray fox, bobcat, and coyote.

Restoration projects

Proposals were made by the California Department of Fish and Game (DFG; now the California Department of Fish and Wildlife) and United States Army Corps of Engineers to restore wetlands of Tule Lake and the adjacent Rodman Slough Reclamation Area.

The Middle Creek Restoration Project plans to remove  of substandard levees.
This will restore  of wetlands and open water, and will improve water quality in Clear Lake.
In 2004 the Lake County water district signed a contract with the USACE to breach some of the levees and restore the former Robinson Lake.
The Army Corps would cover 65% of the costs, but the water district had to compensate over 60 private property owners, raise a section of California State Route 20, reinforce seven PG&E power line pylons and replace a bridge on the  Nice-Lucerne Cutoff.
The water district moved slowly, and took 14 years to spend $12 million of funding that had been supplied by the state.

In 2008 the DFG issued a draft Conceptual Area Protection Plan for the Clear Lake Wildlife Area.
The expanded wildlife area would now cover about  including a large part of Tule Lake, the Middle Creek Restoration Project, additional land to the south of this project, and DFG lands and Land Trust lands south of Rodman Slough.
Over half the area would be wetland habitat, with the remainder being riparian, open water and oak woodland.
The area would conserve and create natural habitat in one of the few relatively natural areas around Clear Lake.
It may be valuable to sensitive species such as the Western pond turtle (Actinemys marmorata), foothill yellow-legged frog (Rana boylii), California red-legged frog (Rana draytonii), tricolored blackbird (Agelaius tricolor), double-crested cormorant (Phalacrocorax auritus), osprey (Pandion haliaetus) and bald eagle (Haliaeetus leucocephalus).

In June 2019 the Lake County Watershed Protection District accepted $15 million from the California Department of Water Resources to purchase and maintain properties affected by the ongoing Middle Creek Flood Damage Reduction and Ecosystem Restoration Project.
It would provide an area to the north, well away from the lake, where the water would slow down and drop its sediment.
It would avert a breach further south, which would release far more sediment and nutrients into the lake.
The state's total contribution would be almost $28 million.

See also
Rivers of Lake County, California

Notes

Sources

 

Rivers of Lake County, California